Maciej Dołęga (born ) is a Polish former footballer who is last known to have played as a forward for Drwęca Nowe Miasto Lubawskie.

Career

Before the second half of 1997/98, Dołęga signed for Polish top flight side Stomil Olsztyn after playing for Czuwaj Przemyśl in the Polish lower leagues.

Before the 2003 season, he signed for Persib Bandung, Indonesia's most successful club, where he became their first foreign scorer.

Before the second half of 2003/04, he signed for Drwęca Nowe Miasto Lubawskie in the Polish lower leagues.

References

External links
 

Polish footballers
Association football forwards
Living people
Expatriate footballers in Indonesia
Persib Bandung players
1975 births
Ekstraklasa players
Pogoń Szczecin players
Polish expatriate footballers
Polish expatriates in Indonesia
OKS Stomil Olsztyn players
People from Przemyśl